Karb is a 2015 Pakistani romantic drama serial on Hum TV. It is directed and produced by Amna Nawaz Khan and written by Rahat Jabeen. It stars Adnan Siddiqui, Armeena Khan and Saman Ansari in lead.

Cast
 Adnan Siddiqui as Hamza 
 Armeena Khan as Haniya(Hamza's wife) 
 Saman Ansari as Aaliya(Hamza's wife)
 Saba Faisal as Sabiha (Haniya's mother)
 Behroze Sabzwari as Fahad 
 Mariyam Khalif as Eman (small)
 Hina Altaf khan as Eman 
 Madiha Zaidi as Noor-ul-Ain 
 Farrukh Aftab as Umar
 Fouzia Mushtaq as Hamza's mother
 Muhammad Ikram as Haniya's brother
 Nida Mumtaz as Mahnoor
 Ikram Abbasi As faisal
 Hina Altaf Khan as eman

Plot
The story revolves around Hania ( Armeena Rana Khan), an innocent unmarried girl who is full of life. She is a typical young girl who has been spoiled by her parents, mostly her mom (Saba Faisal). She gets anything she asks for and loves to shop! Despite being wealthy, she and her family shift to a house on rent. Hania, due to her bubbly nature, quickly becomes friends with a girl Aina (Madiha Zaidi) who's her neighbor. She visits Aina's house very often and when she comes across her brother Hamza (Adnan Siddiqui) she starts having feelings for him. Hania starts to become very serious about Hamza but he on the other hand doesn't seem to even take notice of her. Basically they are two opposites. Hamza is a serious, practical, and mature guy while Hania isn't. Hania tells her mom how much she's in love with Hamza and wants to marry him.

Hania's mother takes the word materialism to a whole new level! Since Hamza and his family are not financially as sound, she keeps forcing her to not make the "mistake" of marrying him. "Aap ke sar pe tou ishq ka bhoot sawaar hai. Aap bohat barri ghalati kar rahi hain Haniaa!!" says her mom. Hania doesn't change her mind and married to him.

Hania has been treated like a princess all her life and she expects the same treatment from Hamza and his family too. But Hamza has a lot of responsibilities of his family already and doesn't have the resources to treat Hania that way, but promises to keep her happy despite that too. But little does he know, just happiness is not what Hania's mom wants for her. Hania at this point argues with her mom that she's happy with Hamza, but her mom keeps forcing her that he hasn't given her enough "gold jewelry" or money so she can't be happy.

To cut a very long story short, Hania's mom was never in favor of Hamza becoming her son in law so she goes to every extent to ruin Hania's happiness. Hania also starts doubting Hamza's cousin Aaliya as she finds out that she used to like him a long time ago yet she had no intentions of creating problems for the two. Hania's mom however fills her brain with so many false accusations about Hamza and Aaliya that she eventually starts hating them. Her mom becomes so successful in her plan that she causes the two to get divorced.

Hania was expecting at the time of their divorce so she threatens Hamza to kill the child but it was only a threat. After the divorce Hania and her family shift to another house to help Hania start a new life. She gets blessed with a baby girl whom she hides from Hamza, but later he finds out about it and files a case to take her custody, but fails. Hania's mom had always wanted Hania to marry Faisal who happens to be her bhabi's cousin. Of course, Faisal is rich. Hania starts working and ignores Emaan (her daughter). When Hamza finds out he tells Hania to either give proper time and care to Emaan or to hand her over to him forever and then go marry Faisal. Hania has yet to decide what option she's going to pick!

Soundtrack
The title song is written by Sabir Zafar, with composition by Sahir Ali Bagga.

Track listing

See also
 List of Pakistani television serials

References

External links
 Official Website

Serial drama television series
Pakistani drama television series
2014 Pakistani television series debuts
2015 Pakistani television series endings
Urdu-language television shows
Hum TV original programming
Hum TV